The Chinese rasbora (Rasbora steineri) is a species of ray-finned fish in the genus Rasbora found in southern China, Laos, and central and northern Vietnam.

References

Rasboras
Cyprinid fish of Asia
Freshwater fish of China
Fish of Laos
Fish of Vietnam
Fish described in 1927